Skultorp is a locality situated in Skövde Municipality, Västra Götaland County, Sweden with 3,642 inhabitants in 2010.

On February 20, 1965, a major train accident in Skultorp claimed 10 lives. A passenger train ran into another non-moving passenger train.

It is home to Billingsdalsskolan, a prominent elementary school in the region.

References 

Populated places in Västra Götaland County
Populated places in Skövde Municipality